Sean Edward Chiplock (born June 21, 1990) is an American voice actor who is known for voicing English versions of Japanese video games and anime. Based in Los Angeles,  Chiplock is known as the voice of Rean Schwarzer from The Legend of Heroes: Trails of Cold Steel series, Revali, Teba, and the Great Deku Tree from The Legend of Zelda: Breath of the Wild and Hyrule Warriors: Age of Calamity, Diluc from Genshin Impact, Shiki Granbell from Edens Zero, Subaru Natsuki from Re:Zero, Guido Mista and Sex Pistols from JoJo’s Bizarre Adventure: Golden Wind,  and Spider-Man from Marvel's Avengers.

Filmography

Anime

Animation

Film

Video games

References

External links 
 
 
 
 

1990 births
Living people
American male video game actors
American male voice actors
Western Michigan University alumni
21st-century American male actors